Kapova cave (also known as Shul'gan-Tash) is a limestone karst cave in the Burzyansky District of Bashkortostan, Russia, ca.  south-east of Ufa, in the southern Ural mountains. Located on the Belaya River in the natural reserve Shulgan-Tash, the cave is best known for the 16,000 years old Upper Paleolithic rock paintings and drawings. It contains the northernmost known ancient paintings.

Description 
Today, this area of wild dense forest and high white rocks, is the habitat of deer, bear, and Bashkort bee. Around 10-20 thousand years ago the climate and the landscape were different. Summer was short, while winter months were very long and cold and the landscape was Tundra.  Humans sought shelter in clefts and caves among the rocks.

The entrance to the cave is situated on the southern slope of the Sarykuskan mountain. It forms a huge arch of  height. To the left of the entrance to the cave is a lake from which the river Shul'gan originates. Inside the cave flows the underground Shul'gan river, that created the cave.

The mouth of the Shulgantash cave called now the Portal. Deep in the Portal the Shulgan stream comes up through the earth forming a pool named Blue Lake. The lake is bottomless. Below 33 Meters in depth it joins a gigantic underground water cavity.

A passageway leads from the Portal to the succession of the ground level halls. First comes the Main gallery, then the Stalagmite hall. The halls differ in size and shape: the Main gallery and the Hall of Chaos are oblong. The Stalagmite and the Dome halls are circular, whereas the Hall of the Signs is rectangular. Their length reaches 90, width 20-30 and the height 7–20 metres. The halls are connected by tunnels of various length and shape, somewhere occur clumply blockages. The air from the outside reaches the Main gallery and slightly felt the Stalagmitic hall too/ But in the Dome hall and onwards both in winter and in summer the air condition is constant. The father we advance the stalactites and stalagmites we meet/ The walls too are covered with calcite sinter which sometimes is half a metre deep. Some of the calcite stones are intricately shaped.

Vestigial traces of the primitive man's life can be found already in the halls of the halls of the ground level. On the walls of the Middle Dome hall one can plainly discern spots of spread read paint as well as some ornament of geometrical figures- the signs. In the neighbouring Hall of the Signs the number of such figures considerable increase. In the corner of the Hall of Chaos. In the soil layer, the archaeologist Shchelinsky discovered remnants of a fire and vestigial traces of ancient people`s vital activity. 

The Hall of Chaos may actually be called the museum of the ground level part of the cave. On its walls one can see a two-coloured picture of long- haired horses, beside them a trapezium like geometrical figure and a little further a group of geometrical signs.

The picture of an anthropoid creature, the only one in Shulgantash cave, Is also to be found in this hall. For many centuries all the drawings had been covered with a semi-transparent calcite crust. The expedition headed by the prominent archaeologist O.N.Bader cleaned the pictures of the horses in 1976. 
In order to ascend to the upper tier of the cave one has to return to the Stalagite hall where there is a hole in the roof leading upwards.
To connect the floor with the hole a steel ladder has been installed which is followed by a stepping slope of earth, where another ladder , which is 16 meters long, takes visitors to the upper tier.

Having climbed the ladder, visitors find themselves in a long and high hall which is called the First gallery. It opens succession of the upper tier halls. Moving further northwards one has to cross the small Antechamber hall in order to get into the most famous hall of the Shulgantash- the Hall of the Drawings.

The cave itinerary in the northern direction can be tracted yet father from here. There are 14 more large and small halls to be visited: the Second gallery, the Acoustice hall, the Oval hall, the hall Temple, the Upper and Diamond halls, the hall of Upper Lake (with a large lake in it), the Rainbow and the Cristal halls, the Hall of the Mountain King, the gallery Hell, the Hall of the Abyss, the Transsyphon hall and the Far hall.

The way to the remote halls is rather complicated with many dangerous sections and pools blocking the trail. In the Transsyphon hall one can see the River Shulgan in its underground flow. Beyond the Far hall there is a cavity filled with water,a siphon. The speleologist and scuba diver Vladimir Kiselyov traveled once as far as 317 meters northwards inside the siphon and had to return, having found no end to it.

The wonder of the Crystal hall is the silvery fringe of calcite icicles hanging from the ceiling. Among the sublime decorations of the cave are "milky rivers" composed of tiny calcite crystals, fragile and crisp, which haven't become solid yet.

The cave brooks sometimes make small funnels in the halls on the floor where may appear grains of cave pearl whereas on the walls there is a crust of marble onyx, in some places half a metre deep. Marble onyx is a type of marble found only in caves.

The Hall of the Drawings 
The most ancient drawings are in the upper tier. They were painted in the Late Paleolithic era., when Cro-Magnons lived on the planet. On the lower tier of the Kapova cave are later images of the end of the ice age. Their size varies between 44 and 112 centimeters. Uranium-thorium dating showed that the oldest drawings in the Kapova cave were made 36,400 years ago.

In January 1959, Alexander Ryumin, a senior researcher at the Pribelsky branch of the Bashkir state natural reserve, made a sensational discovery. He discovered drawings of ancient people on the walls of the Shulgantash (Kapova) cave. Alexander Ryumin, having gone down underground in search of bats, found colorful wall pictures of various animals - horses, rhinos and mammoths . This became a real world sensation - scientists of that time believed that drawings of fossil animals of the Paleolithic era were characteristic only of Western Europe - such an ancient cave painting is found in the world only in France and Spain. From that moment on, the Kapova cave acquired the status of an important historical and cultural complex, which is unrivaled in Eastern Europe.

The best composition is on the right half of eastern wall. In the centre of the composition, within the reach of the ancient painter`s hand, is drawing of an animal, « Ryumin`s horse» , the first picture of all those discovered in the Shulgantash cave. Next are the pictures of several mammoths and a rhinoceros. All the animals are shown walking from right to left with one small mammoth standing or going in the opposite direction. On the opposite wall there are a bison or a bull and mammoths with a calf. In this hall one can also see the picture of a trapezium with strange lines and signs inside the figure and unusual ears at the top. Such geometrical signs are repeatedly occur in the drawings of the Shulgantash (Capova cave).

Discovery, excavation 
Local people were afraid to visit the cave.
The first written information on the Shulgantash cave appeared in January 1760. The first corresponding member of the Russian Academy of Sciences, P.I. Rychkov, visited the Voznessensky factory in Bashkiria. Here he was told about the cave, located 12 km from the factory.

He gave a detailed description of the cave or rather its ground level part in his article "Description of a cave located in the Orenburg province near the Belaya River, which of all the caves in Bashkiria are the most glorious and revered" (in his book Compositions and translations for the benefit and amusement of employees- «Сочинения и переводы к пользе и увеселению служащих», 1760) .

Ten years later (1770) the cave was explored by  Ivan Lepyokhin, who studied the upper tier and gave a vivid picture of it in his travel diary.

By Ivan Lepyokhin "Kapova" name comes from dripping water.

In the middle and later half of the 19th century the Shulgantash cave was studied by a number of travelers and explorers (by geologists of the South Ural N.G. Myaglitsky and A.I. Antipov in 1858). The local forester Fyodor Simon organized sometimes excursions to the cave.

In 1896, the lower floor of the cave was examined by members of the Orenburg branch of the Russian Geographical Society D. Sokolov, I. Zanevsky and F. Simon, who shot a plan of the entrance part of the lower floor and compiled a protocol for its inspection and measurement. Researchers noted that the description of P.I. Rychkova is in full agreement "with the actual state of the cave: in all the indicated places everything that he noted was found".

In 1923 the geologist and scientist G.V.Vakhrushev explored the cave up to Upper Lake. He made its rough sketchy map and issued a small book "The Enigmas of Kapova Cave". There was beginning of research work. 
In 1931 G.V. Vakhrushev came to the cave again, clarified the data about the cave, described the surroundings of the cave. He also wrote about various legends of the Shulgan-Tash cave.

In 1960 the group of Moscow archaeologists headed by O.N.Bader started working in the cave. 
Over his entire work, he has opened more than 30 drawings, including mammoths, horses, rhinos, bison and geometric shapes. The drawings were cleaned from the calcite crust and mud, photographed and thoroughly examined. They were supposed to date back to late Paleolithic period (25-10 thousand years B.C.). The main result of long research was his book “Kapova cave. Paleolithic painting "published in 1965. Bader believed that all the drawings represent a single complex and are relatively simultaneous.

During this period, the study of the Shulgan-Tash cave itself was carried out by employees of Bashkir State University, under the direction of E.D. Bogdanovich and I.I. Kudryasheva. They compiled a real map of the cave. The first microclimatic observations were carried out, distant inaccessible areas were examined.

After the death of Otto Bader in 1979, research in the cave has stopped. There were problems with saving drawings. It was decided to completely close the cave. Work in the cave was resumed only in 1982 by Leningrad archaeologist V.E. Shchelinsky. At that time, he led a comprehensive Paleolithic expedition that conducted archaeological research in the Southern Urals annually.

When were the drawings applied to the walls of the cave? V.E. Shchelinsky managed to answer this question. He discovered under the ancient drawings the remains of the parking of contemporaries of these drawings. He believed that they belong to the Paleolithic era. Also V.E. Schelinsky believes that a significant part of the cave's drawings are combined into compositions reflecting the mythological representations of ancient people. For the first time it was able to identify a well-defined cultural layer of the Upper Paleolithic era, dated by the time about XIV thousand BC Traced focal spots indicate the use of open fire by the ancient inhabitants. In addition, a clay fat lamp, stone, mostly flint tools, pieces of ocher, jewelry in the form of beads and pendants made of stone and small shells of fossil mollusks, bones of animals of the ice age - mammoth, cave bear, fox, hare, marmot were found , pikas, jerboa.

Archaeologist V.N. Shirokov from Yekaterinburg believes that the Shulgan-Tash cave was a sanctuary.

I. V. Kiselev worked in it for a comprehensive study of the Shulgan-Tash cave In 1991. He made dives on the underground river Shulgan.
V.G. Kotov explored the cave and he believes that Kapova cave for the peoples of the Southern Urals was a cult center where rites of initiation and rebirth of nature were performed. V.G. Kotov as well as V.N. Shirokov believes that the rituals that were performed in the cave at that time were associated with initiation rituals.

Yuri Sergeyevich Lyakhnitsky made a detailed and accurate map of the Shulgan-Tash cave massif. In 2002, he identified drawings - the “pale mammoth”, next to him was a drawing of a man and the silhouette of another mammoth.
Now the Shulgantash is considered to be one of the caves which have been studied well enough.

Bashkort legends and traditions 
The heart of the South Urals with Lake Shulgan and the sources of legendary rivers Aghidel, Yaiyk, Hakmar  and Nogosh is associated with the life and deeds of the immortal heroes of the eposes Ural Batyr and Аkbuthat (Akbuzat) which belong to the world art treasures.  For ancient Bashkorts the area was the centre of the earth, where celestial, natural and underwater worlds could interact and interpenetrate.

Very much legends, interesting traditions and fairy tales are related to the cave Shulgan-Tash. The most striking thing is that the main actions in many ancient tales and other folklore works are tied to the Shulgan-Tash cave or the Shulgan lake as soon as possible. And it is no coincidence that both the cave and the lake in them carry the name of the owner of the underworld (underwater king) Shulgen.

Shulgen is one of the major negative characters of many ancient eposes of bashkorts (eposes: "URAL-BATYR", "AKBUZAT", "KARA-YURGA", "AKHAK KOLA" and others); Heroes: Haoban in the epos "Akbuzat"; Kushak-batyr in the epos  "KARA-YURGA"; Batyr Miney in the epic "Kungir Buga." characterizedgan (SHULGEN) arose according to legend from the remnants of the Flood Sea, arranged by the Div (Giant) and Shulgen after being hit by the staff of the earth. About lake Shulgen, for example, in the epos "AKBUZAT" was said: "When the water padishah (King) lost the battle, he found a bottomless pool and dived into this lake. The lake became known as SHULGEN."

In the epos «Akbuzat» and the epos «Ural-batyr» are described sacrifice of a human to lake Shulgan. A beautiful girl was presented to the padishah of the underwater (underground) world (Rychkov found a «dry human head» while visiting the cave in 1760).

In many legends and traditions of bashkorts takes lake Shulgan a central place. So all events in the epos   «Arbuzat» are developed exactly around this lake.  On the surface of the lake at full moon appears the girl Narcas in the image of the gold duck. A young hunter (Haoban)  reseives a gift from her – the horse Akbuzat (Toolpar with wings)  and countless herds of livestock. The only condition for Haoban is at this the prohibition of turning around towards the lake after receipt of gifts. But afraid of the storm caused by the emergence from the lake Toolpar, Haoban looked around and all animals disappeared into the lake again.

The action of the other legend «Kungyr buga» occurs by the lake Shulgan. In this lake Batyr (hero)  Minei finds the missing daughter of the old man and old women. She was stolen by a water thief in this town (the owner of the lake). Batyr descends into the underwater kingdom, cuts down all seven heads of the monster and takes the girls, people, and cattle to the ground.

The motives for horses and cattle living on the lake and their partial disappearance in this same lake are distributed in numerous legends and eposes of bashkorts.

A legend about Yelkysykkan-kul lake, from which horses have come out, is wide in the Burzyan district. This legend (by M.V. Lossievsky) tells about the batyr Bishlak which met during the hunting in the surroundings of the lake Shulgan an amazing wanderer. The wanderer asked Bishlak to give him his dog. The wanderer offered a herd of horses for the dog.
Byshlak was supposed to drive forward without looking back. But out of curiosity, he looked around and the halfway the herd returned to the lake.

The hunter became a rich man and his descendants (tribe)  from his time is called Bayulins (rich). From this herd came the breed of gray horses.

And the lake got the name Yelkysykkan - lake where the horses went out. By the text of description this lake complies with the lake of karst origin near the Shulgan-Tash cave (named the lake Shulgan).

In folk traditions very often is the lake Shulgan the place of birth of miracle horse. So, in the version of the legend “Akhak Kola”, the appearance of the leader of the herd Akhak Kola is described as follows: "Shulgan came to the lake. But he managed to catch only the foal - the mare dived back into the lake, but this foal became lame (from here and her name: «Akhak Kola» – the lame light yellow horse with a black tail).

Legends related to the cave personalize an external force. The cave environment is more severe and incomprehensible than the nature usually environing us. Vladimir Dal who visited the Orenburg province as an official, collected works of oral culture, in particular and Bashkir folklor.  He charakterzed Kapova cave according to bashkir's tails and legends. There are genies, dives (дивы, fantastic creatures), and a stone dog. It is wonderful that the dog is afraid of whips. 
If you hit it a hundred times with a whip, it will rain.

According to P.I. Rychkov, Bashkirs (Bashkorts) usually hid here their families and horses during wars and their uprisings. The cattle naturally stayed in the lower floor of the cave, and women, children and old men went upstairs. Food was always stored here.

References 

 
 
 Ю.С.Ляхницкий.Шульганташ..-Уфа:Китап.2002.с.192-194. ФП- 2001

External links 
 The real story of Russia Kapova Cave
 Official website of the Shulgan-Tash Natural Reserve
 Kapova Cave section of the official website of the Shulgan-Tash Natural Reserve

Caves of Russia
Limestone caves
Caves containing pictograms
Natural monuments of Russia
Archaeological sites in Russia
Cultural heritage monuments of federal significance in Bashkortostan
Upper Paleolithic sites